Miniatürk is a miniature park at the northeastern shore of Golden Horn in Istanbul, Turkey. It opened May 2, 2003. It contains 135 models, in 1:25 scale, of structures from in and around Turkey, and interpretations of historic structures.

Of the park's total area,  is open space;  is covered; and  contain pools and waterways. Its parking lot has a capacity of 300 vehicles.

60 of the park's structures are from Istanbul, 63 are from Anatolia, and 13 are from the Ottoman territories that today lie outside Turkey. Also featured are historic structures like the Temple of Artemis at Ephesus, and the Mausoleum of Maussollos at Halicarnassus (now Bodrum). Additional space is reserved for future models.

References

Gallery

External links 

 Official Miniaturk website
 Official modelbuilder website
 360° view of Miniatürk, at sanalturistanbul.com
 Photos of Miniatürk

Miniature parks
Tourist attractions in Istanbul
Golden Horn
Beyoğlu
Tourism in Istanbul
2003 establishments in Turkey
Protected areas established in 2003